Together Pangea (sometimes stylized as together PANGEA) is an American rock band from Santa Clarita, California that is based in Los Angeles, California. The group has released four full-length albums and is currently signed to Nettwerk Records.

History
Together Pangea was formed in 2009 when longtime friends William Keegan and Danny Bengston met drummer Erik Jimenez at Cal Arts. The group began playing several shows on the California Institute of the Arts campus and as well as many local venues throughout Southern California. Originally formed as Pangea, the group was later forced to change their name to Together Pangea. They released their debut record Jelly Jam in 2010 via Lost Sound Tapes. Living Dummy, the group’s second full-length album was released in 2011 by the Burger Records label. Following the release of the album, they began performing with Ty Segall, Mikal Cronin, Wavves, and The Black Lips. Their first national tour, dubbed the Burgerama Caravan of Stars, saw them share the stage with Gap Dream, Cosmonauts, The Resonars, and Curtis Harding.

In 2014, Together Pangea's third full length was released through Harvest Records. Titled Badillac, MTV called it one of the most anticipated indie releases of 2014. The band set out on a national tour with Mozes and The Firstborn following the album release. Kicking off 2015 with a European tour throughout February and March, the following month saw the band support The Replacements at the Hollywood Palladium in Los Angeles as part of their Back by Unpopular Demand tour. Later that year also saw the release of the six-track EP, The Phage on 16 October, produced by Tommy Stinson.

In 2018, the band returned as a trio of Keegan, Bengston and Jimenez and released a single called "Non Stop Paranoia". In 2019, the trio released the Dispassionate EP, which featured the "Never Said I Wanna" single. In 2021, they released "Marijuana" and "Nothing to Hide", as previews to their fifth album DYE, due to be released on October 22, 2021 by Nettwerk Records.

Discography

Albums

Extended plays

References

External links
 Together Pangea official website

Musical groups from Los Angeles
Musical groups established in 2009
American musical trios
Harvest Records artists